Ali Mwinyigogo is a former Zanzibari politician who was youth and culture minister from 1973-1975 under President Skeikh Mwinyi Aboud Jumbe, travelling to Ghana, Israel and the Soviet Union several times.

Sources
 Cinema, Bell Bottoms, and Miniskirts: Struggles over Youth and Citizenship in Revolutionary Zanzibar by Thomas Burgess, International Journal of African Historical Studies, 2002

Year of birth missing (living people)
Possibly living people
Zanzibari politicians
Government ministers of Zanzibar